Cikha is a town located in Tonzang Township, Chin State of Myanmar (Burma). It is the administrative seat of Cikha sub-township. Most people belong to Zomi group of Chin people.

References 

Populated places in Chin State